Sarpa Daraq (also Romanized as Sarpā Daraq; also known as Sarpa-Dara, Sarpā Dareh, Sarpa Darreh, Sarpeh Daraq, and Sūbeh Daraq) is a village in Bakrabad Rural District, in the Central District of Varzaqan County, East Azerbaijan Province, Iran. At the 2006 census, its population was 41, in 11 families.

References 

Towns and villages in Varzaqan County